James Allen Ransome (July 1806 – 29 August 1875), known as Allen Ransome, was an English agricultural-implement maker and agricultural writer, known from his 1843 publication of The Implements of Agriculture. He was considered as "one of the leaders in a movement which, by bringing the science of the engineer to bear on the manufacture of implements for tilling the ground, has wrought, during the present century, an almost complete revolution in the practice of agriculture."

Biography 
James Allen Ransome was born in 1806 in Great Yarmouth as eldest son of the agricultural-implement maker James Ransome (1782–1849) and Hannah (Née Hunton), his wife. Thus he was also grandson of Robert Ransome (1753–1830), who co-founded Ransomes, Sims & Jefferies. In 1809 he moved with his family to Ipswich where he completed his education at Colchester in 1820.

After leaving school, he became apprenticed to  his grandfather, father, and uncle, who were then carrying on business in Ipswich as Ransome and Sons. From 1826 to 1839 he resided at Yoxford, Suffolk, where a branch of the business was established that he managed. He started a farmers' club there which was the precursor of many similar institutions, notably the Farmers' Club of London, of which Ransome was one of the founders. In 1829 he became partner in the firm then trading under the altered title of J. R. and A. Ransome, and he married.

In 1839 he moved permanently to Ipswich to reside as one of the leading partners of a firm now written as Ransomes and Sims. Under his direction the business increased in size. In 1843 he published an excellent history of 'The Implements of Agriculture,' part of which had been prepared as a prize essay for the Royal Agricultural Society.

He had joined the society in 1838, served on its council, and was one of the most popular figures at its annual shows (cf. Farmers' Magazine, 1857, with portrait). He was alderman of Ipswich from 1865 until his death in 1875.

Ransome died 29 April 1875 at his house in Carr Street, Ipswich. By his wife Catherine (d. 17 April 1868), daughter of James Neave of Fordingbridge, Hampshire, whom he married on 4 September 1829, he left two sons, Robert James and Allen Ransome, and three daughters, one of whom married J. R. Jefferies, an active member of the firm.

Political career
Allen was a Councillor for the Ipswich Corporation.

Selected publications 
 James Allen Ransome. The Implements of Agriculture. J. Ridgway, 1843
 James Allen Ransome. On Principle Strikes Wise & freeman. 1890

References 

Attribution
 This article incorporates public domain material from:

External links 
 J Allen Ransome at oldpond.com
 James Allen Ransome at gracesguide.co.uk

1806 births
1875 deaths
People from Great Yarmouth
Agricultural writers
English industrialists
People of the Industrial Revolution
English mechanical engineers
English inventors
Agricultural engineers
History of Ipswich
English railway mechanical engineers
British railway pioneers
People from Yoxford
19th-century English businesspeople